This is a list of newspapers in West Virginia, sorted by location.

Daily and nondaily newspapers

College newspapers
Marshall University, Huntington
The Parthenon
West Virginia University, Morgantown
The Athenaeum
Shepherd University, Shepherdstown
The Picket

Defunct newspapers

See also
 West Virginia media
 List of radio stations in West Virginia
 List of television stations in West Virginia
 Media of cities in West Virginia: Charleston, Huntington, Wheeling
 Journalism
 :Category:Journalists from West Virginia
 West Virginia University Reed College of Media, in Morgantown
 Marshall University Pitt School of Journalism and Mass Communications (est. 1926)
 West Virginia literature

References

Bibliography
 
 
 
 
 
 
  (Includes information about newspapers)
 
 
 
  (About newspaper industry in W. Virginia)

External links